The 2018–19 Campeonato Nacional da Guiné-Bissau is the 42nd season (since independence) of the Campeonato Nacional da Guiné-Bissau, the top-tier football league in Guinea-Bissau. The season started on 22 December 2018. Several clubs play home games at the 20,000-capacity Estádio 24 de Setembro.

Champions

Standings
Final table.

  1.UDIB                     26  17  3  6  38-22  54       Champions
  2.Nuno Tristão de Bula     26  13  8  5  33-20  47
  3.Sporting de Bafatá       26  13  4  9  28-27  43  [2 2 0 0 3-1 6]
  4.Sporting da Guiné-Bissau 26  11 10  5  31-14  43  [2 0 0 2 1-3 0]
  5.FC Cuntum                26  12  6  8  28-19  42
  6.Benfica de Bissau        26  12  5  9  32-17  41
  7.Os Balantas de Mansôa    26   9  9  8  21-24  36
  8.Flamengo de Pefine       26   8 11  7  21-26  35
  9.Portos de Bissau         26   9  6 11  35-33  33
 10.FC Pelundo               26   8  5 13  25-26  29
 11.Desportivo de Gabú       26   5 11 10  21-30  26
 12.Atlético de Bissorã      26   6  7 13  14-25  25
 ---------------------------------------------------
 13.Lagartos de Bambadinca   26   5  9 12  23-38  24       Relegated
 14.Desportivo de Farim      26   3  8 15  16-45  17       Relegated

References

Campeonato Nacional da Guiné-Bissau
Campeonato Nacional
Campeonato Nacional
Guinea-Bissau